The Erg Admer is a large erg or field of sand dunes in the Sahara Desert. Situated in the Illizi Province west of the oasis town of Djanet in south-eastern Algeria, the erg covers an area some 20 km wide by some 100 km large north to south. It originates in the centre of Tassili n'Ajjer, towards Essendilène and extends southwards to reach Ténéré at the Niger border.

Assemblages of lithic industry have been discovered, such as Acheulean and Aterian hand axes. To the east of Erg Admer there is the Tighaghart with La vache qui pleure rock gravings.

References

Sahara
Landforms of Algeria
Natural regions of Africa
Ergs of Africa